John Isner and Sam Querrey were the defending champions but lost in the first round to Jürgen Melzer and Philipp Petzschner.
Marcel Granollers and Marc López won the title defeating Łukasz Kubot and Janko Tipsarević 6–3, 6–2 in the final.

Seeds
All seeds receive a bye into the second round.

Draw

Finals

Top half

Bottom half

References
 Main Draw

Italian Open - Doubles
Men's Doubles